Salem is a home rule-class city in Livingston County, Kentucky, in the United States. Salem is part of the Paducah micropolitan area. The population was 752 during the 2010 census, down from 769 in 2000. It the largest city in Livingston County, although the census-designated place of Ledbetter has more than twice the population of Salem.

History
The city is believed to have been settled  by immigrants from Salem, North Carolina, who named their new community after their former home. It replaced Centerville as Livingston Co.'s seat in 1809, but it was replaced in turn by Smithland in 1842, after the removal of Crittenden County left it more centrally-located.

Geography
Salem is located at  (37.264694, -88.241221).

Demographics

At the 2000 census there were 769 people in 322 households, including 202 families, in the city. The racial makup of the city was 99.22% White, 0.26% African American, 0.13% from other races, and 0.39% from two or more races. Hispanic or Latino of any race were 0.65%.

Of the 322 households 20.8% had children under the age of 18 living with them, 51.9% were married couples living together, 8.1% had a female householder with no husband present, and 37.0% were non-families. 34.2% of households were one person and 23.0% were one person aged 65 or older. The average household size was 2.14 and the average family size was 2.72.

The age distribution was 16.9% under the age of 18, 6.6% from 18 to 24, 19.9% from 25 to 44, 25.1% from 45 to 64, and 31.5% 65 or older. The median age was 51 years. For every 100 females, there were 80.9 males. For every 100 females age 18 and over, there were 80.5 males.

The median household income was $29,196 and the median family income  was $37,857. Males had a median income of $29,375 versus $20,000 for females. The per capita income for the city was $16,156. About 7.1% of families and 10.7% of the population were below the poverty line, including 14.8% of those under age 18 and 12.3% of those age 65 or over.

References

Cities in Livingston County, Kentucky
Cities in Kentucky